Duguet is a surname. Notable people with the surname include:

 Michel Duguet (born 1961), French scrabble and bridge player
 Paola Duguet (born 1987), Colombian-American swimmer
 Romain Duguet (born 1980), Swiss Olympic show jumping rider
 Victorin Duguet (1905–1989), French trade union leader